Selside is a small village in rural Cumbria, England, about  north of Kendal, close to the A6 road. It is now in the civil parish of Selside and Fawcett Forest, though it was formerly in the parish of Kendal. The population of Whitwell and Selside civil parish taken at the 2011 census was 296.

St. Thomas's Church at Selside dates from 1838, with the tower added in 1894.  Near to the church, Selside Hall incorporates the remains of two pele towers of the 15th and 16th centuries, with 18th-century and later alterations and additions.

See also

Listed buildings in Whitwell and Selside

References

External links

Villages in Cumbria
South Lakeland District